WYSU (88.5 FM, "Radio You Need to Know") is a National Public Radio member radio station. Licensed to serve Youngstown, Ohio, United States, the station is currently owned by Youngstown State University.

WYSU also hosts the Youngstown Radio Reading Service, which broadcasts on a subcarrier.

History

 1967: Don Elser, Steve Grcevich, and YSU President Albert Pugsley propose a fine arts radio station for Youngstown State University and the Mahoning Valley Community
 1969: 
 At 10:00 a.m. October 23, WYSU-FM signs on the air at 88.5 MHz as a charter member of National Public Radio, broadcasting 12 hours daily from its studios in room 310 of the former Valley Park Motel on Wick Avenue. Original staff members were:
 Steve Grcevich, Director of Telecommunications
 Bill Foster, Announcer/Record Librarian
 Polly Golden, Secretary
 Lew Moler, Chief Engineer
 Richard Stevens, Program Director
 Began airing All Things Considered
 Aired first edition of Folk Festival with Charles Darling
 1971: Became part of the first radio network using satellite delivery of programs
 1972: Aired first edition of Now's The Time with Martin Berger
 1973: Began airing Saturday Night on Broadway with Don Elser
 1974: Began 18-hour broadcast day
 1976: Moved studios to newly built Cushwa Hall
 1980:
 Began 24-hour broadcast day
 First on-air fundraiser
 1985:
 Morning Edition began
 Robert Peterson named director
 1987:
 Bill Foster passes away
 Barbara Krauss named announcer/producer
 1988: Ann Cliness named announcer/producer
 1990: Began summer bus excursions to Blossom Music Center
 1991:
 Began operation of new 50,000 watt transmitter with antenna moved to WKBN tower
 Aired live coverage of the first Gulf War
 1993: Ashtabula translator began operation at 90.1 FM
 1995: New Wilmington translator began operation at 89.9
 1996:
 Added state-of-the-art digital editing equipment
 Sponsored first Mad About The Arts
 Automated overnight programs
 1997: Added political affairs program Commentary Cafe
 1998:
 Michael Cervone named announcer/producer
 Improved New Wilmington signal by moving translator to 97.5 FM
 2000:
 First station-sponsored European tour: Great Britain
 Gary Sexton named director of broadcasting
 Added website & streaming audio
 Initiated Robert W. Peterson Scholarship
 2001:
 David Luscher named associate director
 Aired live coverage of 9/11
 Expanded news programming
 2003:
 Began broadcasting Youngstown 2010 simulcasts with PBS 45 &49
 Added A Prairie Home Companion
 2004: Installed digital equipment in the broadcast studios
 2006: Began first strategic planning process since station made its debut
 2007:
 Began broadcasting in HD (digital)
 Began Lincoln Avenue community affairs program
 2008:
 Added all-classical HD channel
 Added all-classical Internet stream

Translators
WYSU simulcasts on two low-power transmitters: W201DP in Ashtabula, broadcasting on 88.1 MHz with 38 watts, and W209CQ in New Wilmington, Pennsylvania, broadcasting on 89.7 MHz with 27 watts.

External links
WYSU official website

YSU
Radio stations established in 1969
NPR member stations
Youngstown State University
YSU
1969 establishments in Ohio